Gran Teatro Cervantes is a theatre, dedicated to Miguel de Cervantes, in Tangier, Morocco. The theatre was built in 1913 by the Spanish.

History
The construction was led by Esperanza Orellana, her husband Manuel Peña and the owner Antonio Gallego. The first stone was laid on April 2, 1911, in a solemn ceremony, and was completed in 1913, the year of its inauguration. Its capacity is 1400 seats.

References

Buildings and structures in Tangier
Theatres in Morocco
Theatres completed in 1913
Art Deco architecture
1913 establishments in Morocco
Tourist attractions in Tangier
20th-century architecture in Morocco